NSLP is an initialism that may refer to

National School Lunch Program
Nova Scotia Liberal Party
Nova Scotia Light and Power

See also
Nova Scotia Lighthouse Preservation Society (NSLPS)